Polyphenylene sulfide (PPS) is an organic polymer consisting of aromatic rings linked by sulfides. Synthetic fiber and textiles derived from this polymer resist chemical and thermal attack. PPS is used in filter fabric for coal boilers, papermaking felts, electrical insulation, film capacitors, specialty membranes, gaskets, and packings. PPS is the precursor to a conductive polymer of the semi-flexible rod polymer family. The PPS, which is otherwise insulating, can be converted to the semiconducting form by oxidation or use of dopants.

Polyphenylene sulfide is an engineering plastic, commonly used today as a high-performance thermoplastic. PPS can be molded, extruded, or machined to tight tolerances. In its pure solid form, it may be opaque white to light tan in color.

An easy way to identify the compound is by the metallic sound it makes when struck.

Manufacturers and trade names
PPS is marketed by different brand names by different manufacturers. The major industry players are China Lumena New Materials, Solvay, Kureha, SK Chemicals, Celanese, DIC Corporation, Toray Industries, Zhejiang NHU Special Materials, SABIC, and Tosoh. Other manufacturers include Chengdu Letian Plastics, Lion Idemitsu Composites, and Initz (a joint venture of SK Chemicals and Teijin).

The following are examples of brand names by manufacturer and PPS type:

 Tedur, Albis Plastic, linear type
 DIC.PPS, DIC Corporation, linear and cross-linked
 DURAFIDE, Polyplastics Co. Ltd, linear type
 ECOTRAN, INITZ, distributed and compounded via A. Schulman
 Fortron, Ticona, linear type
 Petcoal, Tōsō
 Therma-Tech TT9200-5001, PolyOne Corporation
 Ryton, Solvay Specialty Polymers, linear and cross-linked
 Torelina Toray
 NHU-PPS, Zhejiang NHU Company Ltd., linear type and cross-linked

Characteristics
PPS is one of the most important high temperature thermoplastic polymers because it exhibits a number of desirable properties. These properties include resistance to heat, acids, alkalies, mildew, bleaches, aging, sunlight, and abrasion. It absorbs only small amounts of solvents and resists dyeing.

Production
The Federal Trade Commission definition for sulfur fiber is "A manufactured fiber in which the fiber-forming substance is a long chain synthetic polysulfide in which at least 85% of the sulfide (–S–) linkages are attached directly to two (2) aromatic rings."

The PPS (polyphenylene sulfide) polymer is formed by reaction of sodium sulfide with 1,4-dichlorobenzene:

The process for commercially producing PPS (Ryton) was initially developed by Dr. H. Wayne Hill Jr. and James T. Edmonds at Phillips Petroleum. N-Methyl-2-pyrrolidone (NMP) is used as the reaction solvent because it is stable at the high temperatures required for the synthesis and it dissolves both the sulfiding agent and the oligomeric intermediates.

Linear, high-molecular-weight PPS that is capable of being extruded into film and melt spun into fiber was invented by Robert W. Campbell.

The first U.S. commercial sulfur fiber was produced in 1983 by Phillips Fibers Corporation, a subsidiary of Phillips 66.

References

Molecular electronics
Organic polymers
Organic semiconductors
Synthetic fibers
Thermoplastics

External links
 PPS Characteristics, Processing Methods, Applications 
 The latest application of PPS in automotive parts